We Want In: The Street LP is the fifth studio album released by Outlawz, It was released on August 5, 2008. It features J-Bo of YoungBloodZ, C-Bo, Maserati Rick, and Stormey.

Track listing

Charts

References

External links 
 
 

2008 albums
Outlawz albums
Albums produced by Cozmo
Albums produced by E.D.I.
Gangsta rap albums by American artists